Joana Sá Pereira (born 1993) is a Portuguese politician. As a member of the Portuguese Socialist Party (PS), she has been a deputy in the Portuguese Assembly of the Republic since 2019.

Early life and education
Joana Isabel Martins Rigueiro de Sá Pereira was born in Mealhada in the Aveiro District of Portugal on 4 July 1993. She studied law at the Faculty of Law of the University of Coimbra, initially receiving an undergraduate degree in law and then a master's in legal-forensic sciences. She also obtained a postgraduate diploma in labour law at IDET, the Institute of Business and Labour Law (Instituto de Direito das Empresas e do Trabalho) at the same university. Between 2018 and her election to the Assembly at the end of 2019, Pereira worked as a lawyer in Aveiro.

Political career
While at university, Pereira was the student representative at the Faculty of Law's assembly. After leaving university she became president of the Parish Assembly of Pampilhosa, in the municipality of Mealhada. She became president of the Aveiro District Federation of Socialist Youth in 2017 and at the end of 2020 was elected president of the national commission of Socialist Youth. She is a deputy in the Municipal Assembly of Mealhada, having been elected in 2021.

Pereira was elected as a deputy in the Assembly of the Republic in the 2019 Portuguese legislative election, representing the Aveiro District. She served as a member of the Committee on Constitutional Affairs, Rights, Freedoms and Guarantees and on the Committee of Inquiry into Novo Banco, as well as on the Labour and Social Security Committee. In the 2022 election, called early after the collapse of the governing coalition, she was re-elected, being seventh on the Socialist Party's list for Aveiro District, with the party winning eight seats. In the national election the Socialist Party won an overall majority.

References

1993 births
Living people
People from Mealhada
Socialist Party (Portugal) politicians
Members of the Assembly of the Republic (Portugal)
Women members of the Assembly of the Republic (Portugal)
University of Coimbra alumni